Cho Yang-hyun(Korean:조양현) (born ) is a South Korean wheelchair curler.

He participated at the 2010 Winter Paralympics where South Korean team won a silver medal. He is a  silver medallist.

Wheelchair curling teams and events

References

External links 

Profile at the Official Website for the 2010 Winter Paralympics in Vancouver

Living people
1967 births
South Korean male curlers
South Korean wheelchair curlers
Paralympic wheelchair curlers of South Korea
Wheelchair curlers at the 2010 Winter Paralympics
Medalists at the 2010 Winter Paralympics
Paralympic silver medalists for South Korea
Paralympic medalists in wheelchair curling
Place of birth missing (living people)
21st-century South Korean people